Ashura is the tenth day of Muharram in the Islamic calendar.

Ashura  may also refer to:
 King Ashura, character from Tsubasa: Reservoir Chronicle
 Baron Ashura, a character from Mazinger Z
 Asura (Buddhism) or Ashura
 Ashura Hara, the stage name of Susumu Hara (1947–2015), a Japanese professional wrestler
 Ashura (film), a 2005 Japanese film
 Ashoura (missile), Iranian missile
 Ashura in Algeria, a day of celebration in Algeria

See also 
 Achoura, a 2018 horror film
 Ahura
 Ashur (disambiguation)
 Achour (disambiguation)
 Ashure or Noah's Pudding, a dessert served on the 10th day of Islamic month of Muharram
 Asura, group of Hindu deities